Asperula naufraga is a species of flowering plant in the family Rubiaceae.

Description 
Asperula naufraga was first described in 2000  and is endemic to Greece.

References 

naufraga
Flora of Greece